Richard Ainley (22 December 1910 – 18 May 1967) was a stage and film actor.

He was born in Middlesex, England, the son of Henry Ainley and a half-brother of Anthony Ainley.

Ainley made his stage debut in 1928, initially using the stage name Richard Riddle, taking his mother's maiden name. His American debut came in Foreigners at the Belasco Theater in 1939.

His first motion picture appearance was in 1936 as Sylvius in As You Like It, in which his father also appeared. Other roles included Ferdinand in the television movie of The Tempest (1939), Dr. Hale in Shining Victory (1941), and a Foreign Office official in the thriller Above Suspicion (1943).

Ainley married three times, firstly to actress Ethel Glendinning.  He was divorced from his first two wives; his third wife Rowena Woolf died in 1968.

He retired from film work following a disabling wound received while he was serving in the army during World War II to return to the stage. He was briefly principal of the Bristol Old Vic Theatre School in the early 1960s.

Filmography

References

External links
 
 Richard Ainley (1910-1967), Actor from the National Portrait Gallery (United Kingdom)

1910 births
1967 deaths
English male stage actors
English male film actors
Male actors from London
English male television actors
People from Stanmore
British Army personnel of World War II
20th-century English male actors
Military personnel from Middlesex